Triaxomasia is a small genus of the fungus moth family, Tineidae. Therein, it belongs to the subfamily Nemapogoninae.

Only 2 species are presently placed here:
 Triaxomasia caprimulgella (Stainton, 1851)
 Triaxomasia orientanus (Ponomarenko & Park, 1996)

Footnotes

References
  (2004): Butterflies and Moths of the World, Generic Names and their Type-species – Triaxomasia. Version of 2004-NOV-05. Retrieved 2010-MAY-05.
  [2010]: Global Taxonomic Database of Tineidae (Lepidoptera). Retrieved 2010-MAY-05.

Nemapogoninae
Tineidae genera